Siraj-ud-Din is a retired Pakistani amateur boxer. He won a bronze medal at the 1974 Asian Games and competed at the 1976 Olympics, where he was eliminated in a quarterfinal bout.

1976 Olympic results
Below is the record of Siraj Din, a Pakistani middleweight boxer who competed at the 1976 Montreal Olympics:

 Round of 32: defeated Nicolas Arredondo (Mexico) referee stopped contest in the third round
 Round of 16: bye
 Quarterfinal: lost to Rufat Riskiyev (Soviet Union) referee stopped contest in the second round

References

Living people
Boxers at the 1976 Summer Olympics
Olympic boxers of Pakistan
Pakistani male boxers
Medalists at the 1974 Asian Games
Asian Games bronze medalists for Pakistan
Boxers at the 1974 Asian Games
Asian Games medalists in boxing
Boxers at the 1978 Asian Games
Year of birth missing (living people)
Middleweight boxers
20th-century Pakistani people